Endoclita tosa is a species of moth of the family Hepialidae. It is known from Java, Indonesia.

References

External links
Hepialidae genera

Moths described in 1958
Hepialidae